Frederick William Maude (28 February 1857 – 9 February 1923) was an English first-class cricketer active 1883–97 who played for Middlesex and Marylebone Cricket Club (MCC). He was born in Plumstead; died in St Pancras, London.

References

1857 births
1923 deaths
English cricketers
Middlesex cricketers
Marylebone Cricket Club cricketers
C. I. Thornton's XI cricketers
A. J. Webbe's XI cricketers
Wembley Park cricketers